The J&B Scotch Pro-Am was a golf tournament on the LPGA Tour from 1979 to 1985. It was played at several courses in the Las Vegas, Nevada area.

Tournament locations

Winners
J&B Scotch Pro-Am
1985 Patty Sheehan
1984 Ayako Okamoto
1983 Nancy Lopez
1982 Nancy Lopez

LPGA Desert Inn Pro-Am
1981 Donna Caponi

LPGA National Pro-Am
1980 Donna Caponi

Sahara National Pro-Am
1979 Nancy Lopez

References

External links
Tournament results at Golfobserver.com

Former LPGA Tour events
Golf in Las Vegas
Recurring sporting events established in 1979
Recurring events disestablished in 1985
1979 establishments in Nevada
1985 disestablishments in Nevada
History of women in Nevada